The Desko Mountains are a west-northwest–east-southeast mountain range on Rothschild Island, off northwest Alexander Island.

Geographical context 
Other mountains nearby are Goward Peak, Schenck Peak, Morrill Peak and Thuma Peak.

To the east lies Lazarev Bay, a rectangular bay that separates the east side of Rothschild Island from the north-west coast of Alexander Island.

Exploration 
The mountains were seen (in part) from a distance by F. Bellingshausen in 1821, and by Jean-Baptiste Charcot in 1909, but the nature of the feature remained obscure. 

The Desko mountain range was photographed from the air by U.S. Navy Operation Highjump and the Ronne Antarctic Research Expedition in 1947. The mountain range was further mapped by air by D. Searle of the Falkland Islands Dependencies Survey in 1960. The mountain range was further mapped by the U.S. Navy in 1966, and with Landsat imagery since 1975. 

The island was named by the Advisory Committee on Antarctic Names for Commander Daniel A. Desko, U.S. Navy, Commanding Officer, Squadron VXE-6, Operation Deep Freeze, 1977, and LC-130 aircraft commander, 1976.

See also 
 Larsen Ice Shelf
 Composite Antarctic Gazetteer
 List of Antarctic and sub-Antarctic islands
 List of Antarctic islands south of 60° S
 SCAR
 Territorial claims in Antarctica
 List of Antarctic ice shelves
 Wilkins Sound

Further reading 
 Damien Gildea, Antarctic Peninsula - Mountaineering in Antarctica: Travel Guide

External links 

 Desko Mountains on USGS website
 Desko Mountains on SCAR website
 Desko Mountains distance calculator
 Desko Mountains area map
 Desko Mountains updated long term weather forecast

References 

Mountain ranges of Palmer Land